Idis or IDIS may refer to:
 Idis (Germanic), a female being in Germanic mythology
 IDIS (software), direct data exchange software
 IDIS (technology company), global security and surveillance manufacturer
 Infectious Disease Impact Scale
 International Dismantling Information System
 Interoperable Device Interface Specifications, standards for interoperability for smart meters